Dhanbad Junction railway station, station code DHN, is a railway station of the Indian railway serving the city of Dhanbad, the headquarters of Dhanbad district in the Indian state of Jharkhand. It is the largest railway station in Jharkhand, handling over 100 trains and 100000+ passengers every day. Dhanbad is also the headquarters of the Dhanbad Rail Division of the East Central Railway zone. Grand Chord rail-line that connects Howrah and New Delhi passes through Dhanbad junction.

One of the largest and busiest railway junctions, it is one of the most important stations on the Grand Chord. CIC rail line starts from Dhanbad and ends at Singrauli in Madhya Pradesh. Besides the CIC section there was a direct line to Ranchi which goes through Bokaro and Chandrapura. Most trains bound for Ranchi take this route. Dhanbad has a rail connectivity with the other major parts of the country such as Kolkata, Mumbai, Delhi, Chennai, Ahmedabad, Hyderabad, Kochi, Indore, Bhopal, Gwalior, Jabalpur, Jaipur, Nagpur, Pune, Guwahati, Jamshedpur, Daltonganj etc. Another rail line passing through the district, starts at Kharagpur and ends at Gomoh, this rail line comes under South Eastern Railway. Dhanbad is connected with most of the states through rail network.

There used to be another railway line from Dhanbad connecting it to Jharia and Pathardih. The line used to intersect the CIC section, requiring a diamond crossing. Now that the line has been dis-mantled, the Diamond Crossing is no longer operational.
Previously when there were much less trains from Ranchi and adjoining areas, Dhanbad along with Tatanagar railway station served as the main railway stations for the entire state of Jharkhand.

Overview
The entire belt between Durgapur (158 km from Howrah), and all the way up to Dhanbad and beyond is industrialized. Apart from factories, there are many coalmines, some closed now, and some with fires burning deep in the mineshafts. The mining area extends for a large area, mostly to the south of the tracks. Quite a portion of the track passes through cuttings, where the surrounding area is higher than the track level, resulting in the profusion of characteristic small masonry bridges crossing the tracks." This description is from "Gomoh loco shed and CLW trip record" by Samit Roychoudhury.

History
The East Indian Railway Company  extended its lines to Katrasgarh via Dhanbad in 1894.

In the Railways in Jharia Coalfield, amongst the major sections of EIR were the Dhanbad-Phularitand section (21.6 km) opened in 1894 to Katrasgarh and extended to Phularitand in 1924, and the Dhanbad-Pathardih section opened in 1903.

New developments
In February 2012, The Indian Railways had planned to set up a Railway Station Development Corporation (RSDC)  that will work on improving the major railway stations including Dhanbad Junction by building and developing Restaurants, shopping areas and food plaza for commercial business and improving passenger amenities

Electrification
The Kumardhubi–Dhanbad, Pradhankhanta–Pathardih and Dhanbad–Gomoh sectors were electrified in 1960–61.

Facilities
The station houses all the major facilities like waiting rooms, computerized reservation facility, dormitory, retiring rooms, cafeteria, bookshop, food plaza etc. Existing facilities are being revamped for developing it as model station. The Railway station is a divisional headquarters of East Central Railway and houses a number of non-passenger related facilities like loco sheds, washing lines etc. in its premises.
From 21 November 2016 free RailWire WiFi facility is also available. If You have to come on Manaitand and Joraphatak Area then come across the Platform No. 8, If You have to reach central area of Dhanbad then come across the Platform No. 1A main gate.
You can also get various types of Magazines, NewsPapers, and more facilities on Platform No. 1,2 & 3.

Escalator has been installed in platform 2 and 3 at the station. This proves to be of high help to the senior citizens and the handicapped.

Transport and connectivity
Dhanbad station is very well connected by roadways. There is a bus stand just outside the railway station, where buses for nearby cities like Kolkata, Patna , Jamshedpur, Ranchi, Bokaro, Asansol and Durgapur are easily available.

Outside the station, there is a taxi stand wherein a lot of taxis are always available.

Dhanbad along with Ranchi and Jamshedpur were provided with buses under JNNURM scheme, for city transportation. These buses can be used for local transportation.

Autos remain the mainstay of civilian transport in the city. These autos can be used to travel throughout the length of the city, using very nominal fares.

Significance
Dhanbad Jn is a Category A1, station as well as the divisional headquarters. It is the largest station in the adjoining area, and every train has a halt here. Lying centrally on the Grand Chord it is flanked by Gaya Junction on the Delhi side and Asansol railway station on the Howrah side. It is not uncommon to find long-distance trains getting their locomotives and rakes (occasionally) changed here. All the Duronto Express passing through Dhanbad have a technical stoppage here. Due to shortage in spaces, Dhanbad does-not have any loco-shed at present. It used to have a steam loco shed earlier. It has a trip loco shed at its outer section, has its electric loco shed at Gomoh and its diesel loco shed at Patratu. Being the largest station in the area it finds a very heavy patronage and a huge number of passengers use this station every day. A lot of people from adjoining districts like Bokaro, Koderma, Giridih come to Dhanbad early morning to catch the 'morning trains' to various destinations like Kolkata, Durgapur, Jamshedpur, Ranchi, Patna, Burdwan and Gaya. Dhanbad also became the 1st station in the country to have an AC double-decker express running till  which is now discontinued.

Trains
Dhanbad is the second most profitable division after Mumbai to Indian Railway in terms of revenue generation.
Dhanbad Junction's location on the Delhi Kolkata Grand chord route, makes it served by numerous express and superfast trains from all over the country. Several electrified local passenger trains also run from Dhanbad to neighbouring destinations at regular intervals.

See also

 Dhanbad

References

External links

 

Railway stations in Dhanbad district
Dhanbad railway division
Transport in Dhanbad
Railway junction stations in Jharkhand
Railway stations in India opened in 1894
Indian Railway A1 Category Stations